Shirland is an unincorporated community in Shirland Township, in Winnebago County, Illinois, United States, and is located northwest of Rockford. It is part of the Rockford, Illinois Metropolitan Statistical Area.

History
An earlier name for the area was Kepotah.  The name was changed when the Shirland post office was established August 15, 1857.

References

External links
 Shirland Community Consolidated School
 Shirland United Methodist Church
 Shirland Tri-River Tryers 4-H Club

Unincorporated communities in Winnebago County, Illinois
Unincorporated communities in Illinois
Rockford metropolitan area, Illinois
Populated places established in 1857
1857 establishments in Illinois